The Mexico women's national under 18 ice hockey team is the national under-18 ice hockey team in Mexico. The team represents Mexico at the International Ice Hockey Federation's IIHF World Women's U18 Division I Group B - Qualifications.

World Women's U18 Championship record

Women's national under-18 ice hockey teams
Ice hockey